Patricia's disk-winged bat (Thyroptera wynneae) is a species of disk-winged bat found in South America.

Taxonomy and etymology
It was described as a new species in 2014. The holotype was collected in 2012 in Peru. The eponym for the species name "wynneae" is Patricia J. Wynne, an artist-in-residence for the American Museum of Natural History's Department of Mammalogy. Of Wynne, the authors wrote, "Exceptional for clarity, elegant rendering, and meticulous attention to relevant detail, Patricia's work is immediately recognizable and inimitable."

Description
Patricia's disk-winged bat has a short and narrows nout, and its braincase is globular. Its fur is light brown, long, and woolly and the flight membranes are dark brown. It has oblong adhesive disks on its thumbs and feet.

As of 2016, it was evaluated as data deficient by the IUCN.

References

Thyropteridae
Bats of South America
Mammals described in 2014